Lincoln Township is a township in Huntingdon County, Pennsylvania, United States. The population was 321 at the 2020 census.

The village of Entriken, at the intersection of routes 26 and 994, is the only village in the township.

Geography
According to the United States Census Bureau, the township has a total area of 21.1 square miles (54.7 km), of which 18.9 square miles (49.1 km)  is land and 2.2 square miles (5.6 km)  (10.28%) is water.

Recreation
A portion of the Pennsylvania State Game Lands Number 73 is located along the western border and a portion of Raystown Lake is located near the eastern end of the township.

Demographics

As of the census of 2000, there were 319 people, 142 households, and 101 families residing in the township.  The population density was 16.8 people per square mile (6.5/km).  There were 265 housing units at an average density of 14.0/sq mi (5.4/km).  The racial makeup of the township was 99.69% White and 0.31% African American.

There were 142 households, out of which 23.2% had children under the age of 18 living with them, 64.1% were married couples living together, 4.9% had a female householder with no husband present, and 28.2% were non-families. 26.1% of all households were made up of individuals, and 13.4% had someone living alone who was 65 years of age or older.  The average household size was 2.25 and the average family size was 2.67.

In the township the population was spread out, with 19.1% under the age of 18, 3.4% from 18 to 24, 26.6% from 25 to 44, 28.8% from 45 to 64, and 21.9% who were 65 years of age or older.  The median age was 45 years. For every 100 females, there were 104.5 males.  For every 100 females age 18 and over, there were 104.8 males.

The median income for a household in the township was $28,625, and the median income for a family was $37,500. Males had a median income of $27,500 versus $22,750 for females. The per capita income for the township was $15,457.  About 7.3% of families and 9.4% of the population were below the poverty line, including none of those under age 18 and 14.0% of those age 65 or over.

See also
 Entriken, the family name given to the local village

References

Townships in Huntingdon County, Pennsylvania
Townships in Pennsylvania